Electric motorcycles and scooters are plug-in electric vehicles with two or three wheels. Power is supplied by a rechargeable battery which drives one or more electric motors. Electric scooters are distinguished from motorcycles by having a step-through frame, instead of being straddled. Electric bicycles are similar vehicles, distinguished by retaining the ability to be propelled by the rider pedalling in addition to battery propulsion.

Electric scooters with the rider standing are known as e-scooters.

History

1895 to 1950

The early history of electric motorcycles is somewhat unclear. On 19 September 1895, a patent application for an "electrical bicycle" was filed by Ogden Bolton Jr. of Canton Ohio. On 8 November of the same year, another patent application for an "electric bicycle" was filed by Hosea W. Libbey of Boston.

At the Stanley Cycle Show in 1896 in London, England, bicycle manufacturer Humber exhibited an electric tandem bicycle. Powered by a bank of storage batteries, the motor was placed in front of the rear wheel. Speed control was by a resistance placed across the handlebars. This electric bicycle was mainly intended for racetrack use.

The October 1911 issue of Popular Mechanics mentioned the introduction of an electric motorcycle.

In 1919, Ransomes, Sims & Jefferies made a prototype electric motorcycle in which the batteries were fitted under the seat of the sidecar. Even though the vehicle was registered for road use, it never went past the trial stage.

In 1936, the Limelette brothers founded an electric motorcycle company called Socovel (Société pour l’étude et la Construction de Véhicules Electriques or Company for research and manufacture of electric vehicles) in Brussels. They continued production during the German occupation with their permission. Due to fuel rationing, they found some degree of success. But after the war, they switched to conventional models. The electric models remained available until 1948.

During the World War II, compelled by fuel rationing in the United States, Merle Williams of Long Beach, California, invented a two-wheeled electric motorcycle that towed a single-wheeled trailer. Due to the popularity of the vehicle, Williams started making more such vehicles in his garage. In 1946, it led to the formation of the Marketeer Company (current-day ParCar Corp.).

1950 to 1980
In 1967, Karl Kordesch, working for Union Carbide, made a fuel cell/Nickel–cadmium battery hybrid electric motorcycle.

In the same year, a prototype electric motorcycle called the Papoose, was built by the Indian Motorcycle Company under the direction of Floyd Clymer.

In 1974, Auranthic Corp., a small manufacturer in California, produced a small motorcycle called the Charger.

In the early 1970s, Mike Corbin built a street-legal commuter electric motorcycle called the Corbin Electric. The motorcycle used a 24 volt electric starter motor from a Douglas A-4B fighter plane. In 1975, Corbin built a battery-powered prototype street motorcycle called the City Bike. This motorcycle used a battery manufactured by Yardney Electric.

In June 1975, the first Annual Alternative Vehicle Regatta was held at Mt. Washington, New Hampshire. The event was created and promoted by Charles McArthur, an environmentalist. On June 17, Corbin's motorcycle completed the  uphill course in 26 minutes.

1980s to 2000s
In 1988, Ed Rannberg, who founded Eyeball Engineering, tested his electric drag motorcycle in Bonneville. In 1992, the January issue of Cycle World carried an article about Ed Rannberg's bike called the KawaSHOCKI. It could complete a quarter mile in 11–12 seconds.

In 1995, Electric Motorbike Inc. was founded by Scott Cronk and Rick Whisman in Santa Rosa, California. In 1996, EMB Lectra was built by Electric Motorbike Inc., which used a variable reluctance motor. About a 100 of these were built.

In 1996, the first mass-produced electric scooter, Peugeot Scoot'Elec, was released.

2000 to present

On 26 August 2000, Killacycle established a drag racing record of completing a quarter mile (400 m) in 9.450 seconds on the Woodburn track in Oregon.

In 2006, Vectrix introduced the first commercially available high performance electric scooter, the VX-1. Following insolvency and initial bankruptcy reorganization, the Gold Peak battery group purchased the company in 2009. Vectrix expanded product lines, offering the VX-2 and the three wheeled VX-3. But Vectrix ceased operations in January 2014 and filed for Chapter 7 bankruptcy liquidation, with its remaining assets auctioned off the following June.

In February 2009, at the TED conference, Mission Motors, a San Francisco startup led by a former Tesla Motors engineer, unveiled the Mission One, an electric motorcycle capable of 150 mph. If achievable, this would make the Mission One the fastest production electric vehicle in the world.

On April 4–5, 2009, Zero Motorcycles hosted the "24 Hours of Electricross" event in San Jose. It is considered the first all-electric off-road endurance race.

On June 14, 2009, the first electric Time Trial Xtreme Grand Prix (TTXGP) all-electric street motorcycle race took place on the Isle of Man in which 13 machines took part. Rob Barber riding a motorcycle built by Team Agni won the race.

In September 2009, product manager Jeremy Cleland of Mission Motors broke the AMA electric motorcycle land speed record during the BUB Motorcycle Speed Trials at the Bonneville Salt Flats in Utah, US riding the company's Mission One.

In 2010, ElectroCat, made by Eva Håkansson, set the record time for an electric motorcycle to climb Pikes Peak. The motorcycle, ridden by John Scollon, completed the  course in 16 minutes 55.849 seconds. ElectroCat uses batteries manufactured by A123 Systems.

On June 26, 2011, Chip Yates broke ElectroCat's previous record at Pikes Peak. He completed the course in 12 minutes 50.094 seconds. On 30 August 2011, Yates riding his prototype SWIGZ.COM electric superbike established the official Guinness record of the fastest electric motorcycle.

This did not qualify as a Guinness World record as it wasn't timed by the FIM timing association.

In 2012 Electro Force cycles made their debut as a commuter cycle for commuters to ride to work or for enjoyment. These cycle were built by Jennifer Northern of Issaquah, Washington, US. She became the first woman to develop and manufacture an electric vehicle in the US. Their range was up to 100 miles while maintaining  in all weather and hills. It was the first of their kind built by a woman in the US.

On June 30, 2013, Carlin Dunne riding a Lightning Motorcycle-built electric bike beat conventional motorcycles at Pikes Peak. He clocked a 10 minutes 00.694 seconds at the  course.

On November 20, 2018, VinFast from Vietnam introduced two electric scooter models in Hanoi, with 4 model: VinFast Klara A1 (Lithium-ion battery), VinFast Klara A2 (Lead–acid battery), VinFast Ludo and VinFast Impes.

In 2020, Ola Electric Mobility, a division of Ola Cabs, planned to construct world's largest electric scooter factory near Bangalore, Karnataka, India. The company aims to produce 10 million vehicles annually.

In 2020, Odysse Electric, an Indian manufacturer of electric motorcycles and scooters became India's first on-sale sportsbike-inspired electric bike maker

In 2020, Juan Ayala, an urban planning design professor at Rutgers University, invented smartphone app based rentable e-scooter systems.

In 2021, Bobfleet, the electric motorcycle division of Bob Eco, launched its electric motorcycle to replace petrol fuelled motorcycles on the African continent.

In 2022, VinFast of VinGroup from Vietnam introduced 2 new models: VinFast Theon S and VinFast Feliz S.

In 2023, Bobfleet introduce its next generation model: Model X gen2.

Types
A two- (or sometimes three-) wheeled powered vehicle if ridden with rider astride is termed a motorcycle; if it has a step-through frame with rider seated with feet on a floor panel it is a motor scooter. A smaller vehicle, typically just a deck to stand on with two (or three) wheels and a handlebar on a vertical stem is also termed a scooter; such scooters if unpowered are termed kick scooters, and e-scooters if battery powered. E-scooters are made available for hire by several companies in a scooter-sharing system.

Power source
A restriction on the range of electric motorcycles and scooters is the requirement to cram enough electrical energy into their small frames.

Most electric motorcycles and scooters are powered by rechargeable lithium ion batteries, though some early models used nickel–metal hydride batteries.

Alternative types of batteries are available. Z Electric Vehicle pioneered use of a battery with lead electrodes and an electrolyte of a liquid low sodium silicate compound, a variation on the classic lead–acid battery invented in 1859 and still used for electrical power in internal-combustion-engine automobiles, that compares favorably with lithium batteries in size, weight, and energy capacity, at considerably less cost.

EGen says its lithium-iron phosphate batteries are up to two-thirds lighter than lead-acid batteries and offer the best battery performance for electric vehicles.

In 2017, the first vehicle in the US to use the new Lithium Titanium Oxide (LTO) battery non-flammable battery technology was a scooter called The Expresso. This technology allows a battery to charge in less than 10 minutes, and is capable of  25,000 charges, the equivalent of 70 years of daily charges. The technology, created by Altairnano, is used in China, where over 10,000 urban buses run on these batteries.

Charging
All electric scooters and motorcycles provide for recharging by plugging into ordinary wall outlets, usually taking about eight hours to recharge (i.e., overnight). Some manufacturers have designed in, included, or offer as an accessory, the high-power CHAdeMO level 2 charger, which can charge the batteries up to 95% in an hour.

Battery swapping

Manufacturers like Zero Motorcycles and recent entrants to the scooter market Nanu EV, Gogoro, and Unu have designed machines that allow quick battery swapping, to allow charging without the vehicle needing to be near a charge point, or, with a spare battery or an available battery network, to allow continued travelafter a battery is drained.

In the mid-1990s, Personal Electric Transports-Hawaii (formerly Suntera, now P.E.T.) was making a  capable 3-wheel enclosed-electric motorcycle called the Sunray – designed by noted solar EV pioneer Jonnathan Tennyson. The Sunray's battery cartridge was on rollers and slid out of the front of the vehicle so it could be swapped out for a freshly charged battery at a battery-swap station conveniently located along a highway or in a city. P.E.T. also had streamlined 2-wheel seated motor scooters called Caballito's – designed by Budd Steinhilbur, who was a well known designer of the Tucker 48 automobile. Budd's Caballito's were also adapted for battery-swapping at P.E.T.’s future battery-swap stations. In 2000, P.E.T. added light-electric motorcycle and scooter visionary Todd Bank to their team and P.E.T. secured major funding from the Los Angeles Department of Water and Power to design and prototype the first battery-swap station's for light-electric vehicles and NEV's. P.E.T. prototypes and designs are now on display at museums across America.

Battery swapping is popular in India, with Sun Mobility planning modular batteries. "A moped would require one, a rickshaw two and a car four."

Hybrid
Honda has developed an experimental internal combustion/electric hybrid scooter. Yamaha has also developed a hybrid concept motorcycle called Gen-Ryu. It uses a 600cc engine and an additional electric motor. Piaggio MP3 Hybrid uses a 125cc engine and an additional 2.4 kW motor.

Fuel cell

There are several experimental prototypes using fuel cell technology. ENV developed by Intelligent Energy is a hydrogen fuel cell prototype. Suzuki has also developed a concept hydrogen fuel cell scooter based on the Suzuki Burgman. Yamaha has created a hydrogen fuel cell prototype called FC-AQEL, which is considered equivalent to a 125cc vehicle. Honda has also developed a hydrogen fuel cell scooter which uses the Honda FC Stack.

Electric vs. gasoline machines

Performance

Electric and gasoline powered motorcycles and scooters of the same size and weight are roughly comparable in performance. In August 2013 Road & Track evaluated a high-end electric motorcycle as faster and better handling than any conventionally powered bike. Electric machines have better 0 to 60 acceleration, since they develop full torque immediately, and without a clutch the torque is instantly available.

Range
Electric motorcycles and scooters suffer considerable disadvantage in range, since batteries that fit in a motorcycle frame cannot store as much energy as a tank of gasoline. Consequently, while electric machines excel for city dwellers traveling relatively short distances, on the open road riders experience inhibiting range anxiety.

Maintenance
Electric scooters and motorcycles need very little maintenance. As Wired magazine's transportation editor Damon Lavrinc reported after an experiment of trying to go six months using nothing but a Zero electric motorcycle: "[w]ith only a battery, a motor, and a black box (i.e. the controller) to keep you moving, electric motorcycles are a breeze to maintain compared to a conventional motorcycle, what with all the lubricating and adjusting and tuning you have to do. You basically just worry about consumables: brake pads, tires, maybe a brake fluid flush. That’s about it." Electric scooters and motorcycles equipped with regenerative braking typically have longer brake pad life because a significant portion of braking duty can be performed with the electric motor instead of the mechanical friction brakes.

Fuel cost
At between one and two cents per mile (depending on electric rates), electric machines enjoy an enormous fuel cost advantage. In Australia, UBCO battery Electric Motorbike running cost is 88¢ per 100 km. In India, Ampere Electric Scooter's running cost is at Rs. 0.15 per km.

Refuel time
Even with special equipment, charging a battery takes significantly longer than filling a gasoline tank. With the maximum number of accessory chargers, it takes over an hour to charge a Zero S ZF6.5's 6.5kWh battery to 95% capacity. This refuel time also increases with battery capacity; the Zero S ZF13.0 (which has a 13kWh battery) takes over 2 hours to charge to 95% capacity using the maximum number of accessory. This affects journeys longer than the single-charge range of a motorcycle.

Noise
Electric vehicles are far quieter than gasoline powered ones, so that they may approach a pedestrian who is not watching unnoticed. Some are equipped to produce a warning sound as they travel. Popular Mechanics called the comparative quiet of electric motorcycles the greatest difference between them and their gasoline counterparts, and a safety bonus because the rider can hear danger approaching. Whether a loud motorcycle is safer than a quiet one due to being more noticeable is a matter of dispute. At high speed the whine of a typical electric motorcycle is said to sound "like a spaceship."

On the other hand, electric vehicles do not add to noise pollution.

Sales and adoption

China leads the world in electric scooter sales, comprising 9.4 million of the total 12 million sold worldwide in 2013. As of November 2020, the number of electric scooters in China had reached around 300 million, with annual sales of more than 30 million units. There were only 31,338 electric scooter sales outside the Asia-Pacific region including Europe. The US market is comparatively small, with an estimated 2,000 sold in 2012.

While steadily becoming more practical, high prices and a limited range suited best for commuting have been impediments to electric motorcycles and scooters increasing their market share. In the US at least, cheaper motorcycles that can refuel in minutes at any gasoline station better suit weekend riders, the predominant users. According to a market report published in 2013, the sales of electric motorcycles and scooters in expected to rise over 10-fold by 2018 in North America, to about 36,000 by 2018.

In India, high costs and power grid problems have contributed to slow sales. In states like Tamil Nadu, where power supply of rationed electricity was reduced, a corresponding drop in sales has been observed by electric scooter manufacturers like Ampere and Hero Electric.

Government promotion and incentives

India
In January 2013, the Indian government announced a plan to provide subsidies for hybrid and electric vehicles. The plan will have subsidies up to ₹ 1,50,000 (Approximately US$2,200) for cars and ₹ 50,000 on two wheelers. India aimed to have seven million electric vehicles on the road by 2020. But the scheme was launched in April 2019 by the name of FAME, or Faster Adoption and Manufacturing of (Hybrid and) Electric vehicles.

Taiwan
The premier of the Republic of China (Taiwan) Liu Chao-shiuan said in 2008 that the government-financed Industrial Technology Research Institute (ITRI) will help domestic manufacturers mass-produce 100,000 electric motorcycles in four years.

Senegal 
In March 2022, Tamir Faye, Director General of ANPEJ, signed an agreement for the creation of 50,000 jobs to provide opportunities for young people by using electric motorcycles to strengthen the transport industry.

Motorsports

Pikes Peak International Hill Climb (PPIHC)

The Pikes Peak International Hill Climb began in 1916 and is the second oldest motor sports race in the United States. The PPIHC is a long-standing tradition in the Colorado Springs and Pikes Peak Regions. One of the main obstacles of the race is the increasingly thin air that slows reflexes, diminishes muscle strength and reduces the power of internal combustion engines by 30 percent as competitors advance up the peak. The electric motorcycle division has an advantage with the all-electric motorcycles because they do not experience power loss with increased elevation and thinner air.

The Lightning Motorcycle Super-bike electric motorcycle set the fastest overall time in the motorcycle division, beating all gasoline powered motorcycles in 2013.

TT Zero

TTXGP was conceived by Azhar Hussain. The first race was held on 30 June 2009 on the Isle of Man in which 13 teams took part. The event was endorsed by the Fédération Internationale de Motocyclisme (FIM). In May 2010, TTXGP started a world championship series. It went on to organize several races in US, Europe and Australia. In 2010, TT Zero replaced the TTXGP event in the Isle of Man TT race. Neither TTXGP nor Azhar Hussain were involved in the event. The event followed FIM rules.

FIM eRoad Racing World Cup

On 18 November 2010, Fédération Internationale de Motocyclisme (FIM) announced an ePower International Series for electric motorcycles, causing a split between TTXGP promoters and FIM. FIM, unlike TTXGP, was unable to gather many teams of the series. In March 2011, TTXGP announced it would again collaborate with FIM.

In 2013, TTXGP and FIM collaborated to organize the FIM eRoad Racing World Cup with races in US, Europe and a final race in Asia.

Motocross

In 2013, FIM announced an all-electric event, called E-MX, which was held in Belgium during Clean Week 2020 on 2 May. MiniMoto SX Energy Crisiscross is a regular event where electric off-road motorcycles are allowed to compete against conventional motorcycles.

eMotoRacing
After the TTXGP concluded its 2013 race season, it pulled out of the US, and Arthur Kowitz, who had participated in the FIM eRoad Racing World Cup founded eMotoRacing to fill the void. eMotoRacing kicked off its first season in 2014, running in conjunction with AHRMA which gave access to ten high-profile tracks around the US. In addition to its regular race season, eMotoRacing held its first annual "Varsity Challenge" on July 11–13, 2014, at the New Jersey Motorsports Park, urging engineering teams from universities to race custom-built electric motorcycles. At the start of its third season in 2016, AHRMA announced it had adopted eMotoRacing's "eSuperSport" class as a permanent addition to their roadracing lineup.

MotoE World Cup

MotoE World Cup is set to start in 2019. The series is sanctioned by the FIM and will support MotoGP at five of the European circuits with future plans for the series to grow worldwide. The series will be using a spec Energica EgoGP motorcycle with each of the seven MotoGP independent teams running two bikes while four Moto2 and Moto3 teams will run one bike for a total of 18 bikes competing.

See also

Electric kick scooter
Electric trike
Electric vehicle conversion
Energy density
Government incentives for plug-in electric vehicles
List of fastest production motorcycles by acceleration
Miles per gallon gasoline equivalent
Mobility scooter
Plug-in electric vehicle

References

External links
 
 
 

 
 
 
Motorcycle technology
Motorcycle classifications